Tosantos is a municipality and town located in the province of Burgos, Castile and León, Spain. According to the 2004 census (INE), the municipality has a population of 60 inhabitants.  Tosantos is located on the Camino de Santiago de Compostela, a 1200-year-old pilgrimage route that runs through France and Northern Spain to the Spanish city of Santiago.  The hamlet has a pilgrim hostel which is open from April through October and hosts up to 50 pilgrims a night.

800 years ago a woman, known as La Ermita,  lived in a cave in the cliffs above Tosantos and ministered to the passing Pilgrims.  A chapel has been built into that cave and once a year, on Fiesta day, the inhabitants of Tosantos hold a procession through the town, up the winding path to the cave and give thanks to God, Santa Maria and La Ermita for blessing the town.

References

Municipalities in the Province of Burgos